Formed in 1908 in Richmond, Virginia, the Treble Clef and Book Lovers' Club (TCBLC) is one of the oldest African American book clubs in the United States. The social, nonprofit organization is an association for women who possess an affinity for literature and music.

Background
Treble Clef and Book Lovers' Club was established in 1908 by Mrs. Mary Simpson in Richmond, Virginia. The club predates nearly all of the cultural organizations in the country and is the oldest for African American women in Virginia. It is also one of the oldest book clubs of African American women in the United States.  The club's founding members were Mrs. Annie Hughes, Mrs. Ellen Russell, Mrs. Emma Roper, Mrs. Blanche Burke, and Mrs. Lucille Barco. Treble Clef and Book Lovers' Club celebrated its centennial anniversary in 2008, which was reported by Richmond Times Magazine.

On Saturday, June 12, 2018, the club celebrated its 110th anniversary by hosting the "Music and Prose Soirée" in the Living & Learning Center at Virginia Union University.  The event was a celebration of the arts with Dr. Peyton McCoy serving as the Mistress of Ceremonies and poetically weaving the club's history throughout the program. Performers included vocalist Joye B. Moore, jazz pianist Dr. W. Weldon Hill, saxophonist Juan "JD" Young, jazz bassist Michael Hawkins, and the Victor Haskins Quartet.  Kym Grinnage, Vice President of the NBC affiliate WWBT, and his wife, Kyle Grinnage performed an entertaining dance and educated guests on the origins of "the hustle". The event was covered by RVA Magazine.

Founder
Mrs. Simpson was the wife of Dr. Joshua B. Simpson, a Latin Professor at Virginia Union University (VUU), one of 105 Historically Black Colleges and Universities (HBCU) in America. A native of New England, Mrs. Simpson lived in Washington, D.C. where she enjoyed an enriched cultural and social life, including membership of the Treble Clef Book and Music Lovers' Club. After she relocated to Richmond, Mrs. Simpson wanted to replicate her cultural experience in DC and formed a similar club. Initially, the members were married ladies whose husbands were the faculty of VUU. Today, the Treble Clef and Book Lovers' Club is composed of single and married women who hold prominent positions in education, business and health. Many are professional musicians and published authors.

Past presidents

Mrs. Mary Simpson: 1908–1943
Mrs. Bernice Nelson Sampson: 1946–1971
Mrs. Georgia Sampson Williams: 1971–1991
Mrs. Grace Charity:  1991–1993
Mrs. Irma Browne: 1993–2004

Bibliography
Treble Clef and Book Lovers' Club: A Pictorial History, 1904–2004: The History of a Woman's Club. By Dorothy N. Cowling

References

Treble Clef and Book Lovers' Club web address:  www.trebleclefandbookloversclub.org

Book clubs
African-American women's organizations
1908 establishments in Virginia
African Americans in Virginia
Women in Virginia
Richmond, Virginia